A list of films produced in Argentina in 1960:

External links and references
 Argentine films of 1960 at the Internet Movie Database

1960
Films
Argentine